Morula ambrosia is a species of sea snail, a marine gastropod mollusk in the family Muricidae, the murex snails or rock snails.

Description

Distribution
This marine species occurs off the Marshall Islands.

References

ambrosia
Gastropods described in 1995